The 2009–10 season was the 104th season in Atlético Madrid's history and their 73rd season in La Liga, the top division of Spanish football. It covers a period from 1 July 2009 to 30 June 2010.

Atlético salvaged a largely disappointing season, thanks to a late resurgence resulting in the UEFA Europa League title, following a 2–1 final victory against Fulham. During the course of the tournament, Atlético overcame Liverpool among others, much thanks to Diego Forlán's goalscoring talent. Forlán scored the winning away goal against Liverpool in the extra-time during the semis, as well as two goals against Fulham, culminating in another extra time-winner.

Elsewhere, Atlético reached the final of Copa del Rey, where it lost to Sevilla. The league and Champions League runs were disappointing, however, not winning a single game in Champions League, and just finishing in the top half of the league.

Transfers
In (summer):

 Sergio Asenjo: €5m from Real Valladolid

 Leandro Cabrera: €1.5m from Defensor Sporting

 Juanito: Free from Real Betis

In (winter):

 Eduardo Salvio: €10m from Lanús

 Tiago: Loan from Juventus

Out (summer):

 John Heitinga: €7.04m to Everton

 Grégory Coupet: To PSG

 Luis García to Racing Santander

 Miguel de las Cuevas To Sporting Gijón

 Maniche Free to Köln

 Leo Franco: Free to Galatasaray

 Giourkas Seitaridis: Free to Panathinaikos

Out (winter):

 Florent Sinama Pongolle: €6.5m to Sporting CP

 Maxi Rodríguez: Free to Liverpool

 Roberto: Loan to Olympiacos

Squad

Goalkeepers
  David de Gea (43/13)
  Sergio Asenjo (1)
  Roberto (13 until January 2010)

Defenders
  Juan Valera Espín (2)
  Antonio López (C) (3)
  John Heitinga (5 until September 2009)
  Mariano Pernía (4)
  Juanito (16)
  Tomáš Ujfaluši (17)
  Álvaro Domínguez (18)
  Luis Perea (21)
  Pablo Ibáñez (22)
  Leandro Cabrera (24)

Midfielders
  Tiago (5 since January 2010)
  Ignacio Camacho (6)
  Raúl García (8)
  Jurado (9)
  Maxi Rodríguez (11)
  Paulo Assunção (12)
  Eduardo Salvio (14 since January 2010)
  José Antonio Reyes (19)
  Simão (20)
  Cléber (23)
  Koke (29)
  Cedric (57)
   Rubén Pérez (35)

Attackers
  Diego Forlán (7)
  Sergio Agüero (10)
  Florent Sinama Pongolle (14 until January 2010)
  Borja González (27, later 55)
  Ibrahima Baldé (58)
  Jorge Molino (59)
  Sebastián Gallegos

Competitions

La Liga

League table

Matches

Málaga–Atlético Madrid 3-0
 1-0 Nabil Baha 
 2-0 Manu 
 3-0 Manu Torres 
Atlético Madrid–Racing Santander 1-1
 1-0 Jurado 
 1-1 Óscar Serrano 
Barcelona–Atlético Madrid 5-2
 1-0 Zlatan Ibrahimović 
 2-0 Lionel Messi 
 3-0 Dani Alves 
 4-0 Seydou Keita 
 4-1 Sergio Agüero 
 4-2 Diego Forlán 
 5-2 Lionel Messi 
Atlético Madrid–Almería 2-2
 0-1 Pablo Piatti 
 1-1 Cléber 
 2-1 Diego Forlán 
 2-2 Pablo Piatti 
Valencia–Atlético Madrid 2-2
 0-1 Sergio Agüero 
 1-1 Pablo Hernández 
 2-1 David Villa 
 2-2 Maxi Rodríguez 
Atlético Madrid–Real Zaragoza 2-1
 1-0 Jurado 
 2-0 Antonio López 
 2-1 Ewerthon 
Osasuna–Atlético Madrid 3-0
 1-0 Walter Pandiani 
 2-0 Walter Pandiani 
 3-0 Carlos Aranda 
Atlético Madrid–Mallorca 1-1
 1-0 Diego Forlán 
 1-1 Borja Valero 
Athletic Bilbao–Atlético Madrid 1-0
 1-0 Javi Martínez 
Atlético Madrid–Real Madrid 2-3
 0-1 Kaká 
 0-2 Marcelo 
 0-3 Gonzalo Higuaín 
 1-3 Diego Forlán 
 2-3 Sergio Agüero 
Deportivo–Atlético Madrid 2-1
 0-1 Sergio Agüero 
 1-1 Diego Colotto 
 2-1 Andrés Guardado 
Atlético Madrid–Espanyol 4-0
 1-0 Diego Forlán 
 2-0 Sergio Agüero 
 3-0 Sergio Agüero 
 4-0 Maxi Rodríguez 
Xerez–Atlético Madrid 0-2
 0-1 Diego Forlán 
 0-2 Sergio Agüero 
Atlético Madrid–Villarreal 1-2
 1-0 Simão 
 1-1 David Fuster 
 1-2 Joseba Llorente 
Tenerife–Atlético Madrid 1-1
 1-0 Nino 
 1-1 Jurado 
Atlético Madrid–Sevilla 2-1
 0-1 Renato 
 1-1 Ivica Dragutinović 
 2-1 Antonio López 
Valladolid–Atlético Madrid 0-4
 0-1 Jurado 
 0-2 Diego Forlán 
 0-3 José Antonio Reyes 
 0-4 Sergio Agüero 
Atlético Madrid–Sporting Gijón 3-2
 1-0 Diego Forlán 
 1-1 Diego Castro 
 2-1 Paulo Assunção 
 3-1 Ibrahima Baldé 
 3-2 Luis Morán 
Getafe–Atlético Madrid 1-0
 1-0 Manu del Moral 
Atlético Madrid–Málaga 0-2
 0-1 Duda 
 0-2 Javi López 
Racing Santander–Atlético Madrid 1-1
 0-1 Diego Forlán 
 1-1 Gonzalo Colsa 
Atlético Madrid–Barcelona 2-1
 1-0 Diego Forlán 
 2-0 Simão 
 2-1 Zlatan Ibrahimović 
Almería–Atlético Madrid 1-0
 1-0 Pablo Piatti 
Atlético Madrid–Valencia 4-1
 0-1 David Silva 
 1-1 Diego Forlán 
 2-1 Sergio Agüero 
 3-1 Diego Forlán 
 4-1 Jurado 
Real Zaragoza–Atlético Madrid 1-1
 1-0 Jiří Jarošík 
 1-1 Ibrahima Baldé 
Atlético Madrid–Osasuna 1-0
 1-0 Jurado 
Mallorca–Atlético Madrid 4-1
 1-0 Víctor 
 1-1 Diego Forlán 
 2-1 Aritz Aduriz 
 3-1 Luis Perea 
 4-1 Felipe Mattioni 
Atlético Madrid–Athletic Bilbao 2-0
 1-0 Diego Forlán 
 2-0 Sergio Agüero 
Real Madrid–Atlético Madrid 3-2
 0-1 José Antonio Reyes 
 1-1 Xabi Alonso 
 2-1 Álvaro Arbeloa 
 3-1 Gonzalo Higuaín 
 3-2 Diego Forlán 
Atlético Madrid–Deportivo La Coruña 3-0 
 1-0 Juanito 
 2-0 Diego Forlán 
 3-0 Tiago 
Espanyol–Atlético Madrid 3-0
 1-0 Víctor Ruiz 
 2-0 Pablo Osvaldo 
 3-0 Iván Alonso 
Atlético Madrid–Xerez 1-2
 0-1 Mario Bermejo 
 1-1 Diego Forlán 
 1-2 Emilio Armenteros 
Villarreal–Atlético Madrid 2-1
 1-0 Diego Godín 
 2-0 Giuseppe Rossi 
 2-1 Sergio Agüero 
Atlético Madrid–Tenerife 3-1
 1-0 Eduardo Salvio 
 2-0 Eduardo Salvio 
 2-1 Román Martínez 
 3-1 Sergio Agüero 
Sevilla–Atlético Madrid 3-1
 1-0 Luís Fabiano 
 1-1 Tiago 
 2-1 Álvaro Negredo 
 3-1 Álvaro Negredo 
Atlético Madrid–Valladolid 3-1
 1-0 Juanito 
 2-0 Jurado 
 3-0 Diego Forlán 
 3-1 Jonathan Sesma 
Sporting Gijón–Atlético Madrid 1-1
 1-0 Miguel de las Cuevas 
 1-1 Ibrahima Baldé 
Atlético Madrid–Getafe 0-3
 0-1 Roberto Soldado 
 0-2 Roberto Soldado 
 0-3 Dani Parejo

Topscorers
  Diego Forlán 18
  Sergio Agüero 12
  Jurado 5
  Ibrahima Baldé 3

UEFA Champions League

Play-Off Round

Group stage

UEFA Europa League

Knockout phase

Last 32

Last 16

Quarter-final

Semi-final

Final

Atlético Madrid seasons
Atletico Madrid
UEFA Europa League-winning seasons